Sivaji Park is an urban park in the Indian city of Visakhapatnam. Originally a dumping yard, it was created in 1999 with an initial investment of  8 lakh.

It is one of the most famous attractions of Visakhapatnam. However, The Hindu reports that the park has become a garbage dump with "Overgrown shrubs, broken benches, and play equipment".

Image Gallery

References

Parks in Visakhapatnam
1999 establishments in Andhra Pradesh
Tourist attractions in Visakhapatnam
Uttarandhra